Miss Asia Pacific International is one of the oldest international beauty pageant based in Manila, Philippines.

A woman who can be confident and proud of her unique traits as well as appreciate and value those of others, can help pave way to a better and brighter future. The pageant is a pedestal for women who want to be the voice of celebrating beauty and harmony in diversity. May it be in the form of culture, race, belief, or opinion, we believe that all women are distinctly beautiful and one of a kind.

 Mission — Miss Asia Pacific International inspires women to be comfortable in their own skin and to believe that their individuality is one of the key qualities that make them distinctly beautiful. To provide opportunities for them to develop their skills, achieve their highest potential, and be the epitome of a strong, empowered. and confident woman.
 Vision — Miss Asia Pacific International is a platform for women to learn, improve, and ignite positive change within herself, and the global community.

History
The pageant was founded in 1965 as "Miss Asia" contest and the first titleholder was Angela Filmer from Malaysia. She was crowned by the wife of then President of the Philippines, Imelda Marcos on December 4, 1965. The contest had a humble beginning with only 18 countries participating in the first edition. The pageant was first only accepted contestants from Asia and Oceania countries to compete but the rules changed in 1985.

The pageant's title was changed to "Miss Asia Pacific" in 1984 then to "Miss Asia Pacific Quest" in 1985 after participants from countries in the Americas and the Pacific Ocean were allowed to compete. Since 2005, the pageant was again renamed to Miss Asia Pacific International and every countries from all over the world were allowed to participate in the competition. The pageant was not held in 1990 due to Luzon earthquake and in 1991 due to Mount Pinatubo eruption; also in 2004 and from 2006 to 2015.

In 2005, winner Leonora Jimenez Monge from Costa Rica was dethroned after taking part in participating at Miss World contest. The first runner-up, Yevgeniya Lapova from Russia was given the crown and title. The pageant was then suspended after the conclusion of the 2005 edition. 12 years later in 2016, the pageant was revived and the winner was Tessa le Conge from the Netherlands.

The most recent titleholder was Chaiyenne Huisman from Spain, who was crowned on 9 October 2019.

Due to the restrictions brought about by the ongoing COVID-19 pandemic, the organizers ceased to stage another competition since the last edition. They informed the public that the pageant will remain suspended until further notice.

Titleholders

Countries/Territory by winning number

See also
List of beauty pageants

References

External links
Official website

 
Beauty pageants in the Philippines
Continental beauty pageants
Recurring events established in 1968